The Benelli T50 or 50 Turismo was a  two-stroke single-cylinder engine moped made by Benelli from 1973.  The 'T' stands for 'Turismo' which translates to 'Tourism' or 'Touring' as it is generally referred to.  The T50 shares most of its mechanics with the similar Benelli 50 Cross, a motorcross version of this model.  Other similar models include the T50 LUX and GTV 50.

Part of the 'Sports Moped' boom of the 1970s that happened across Europe at this time similar mopeds were produced by many companies including other Italian manufacturers such as Italjet and Gilera.

See also
List of Benelli motorcycles
Benelli

References

Mopeds
Two-stroke motorcycles
Benelli motorcycles